The Australian Government Department of Communications was a department responsible for helping to develop a vibrant, sustainable and internationally competitive broadband, broadcasting and communications sector in Australia and promoting the digital economy.

The head of the department was the Secretary of the Department of Communications, Drew Clarke, who reported to Malcolm Turnbull, then the Minister for Communications.

History
The Department of Communications replaced the Department of Broadband, Communications and the Digital Economy (DBCDE) in September 2013 after the Liberal-National Coalition won the 2013 election.

In September 2015, the department was dissolved and replaced by the Department of Communications and the Arts.

Preceding departments
Postmaster-General's Department (1 January 1901 – 22 December 1975)
Department of the Media (19 December 1972 – 22 December 1975)
Postal and Telecommunications Department (22 December 1975 – 3 November 1980)
Department of Communications (3 November 1980 – 24 July 1987)
Department of Transport and Communications (24 July 1987 – 23 December 1993)
Department of Communications (23 December 1993 – 30 January 1994)
Department of Communications and the Arts (30 January 1994 – 21 October 1998)
Department of Communications, Information Technology and the Arts (21 October 1998 – 3 December 2007)
Department of Broadband, Communications and the Digital Economy (3 December 2007 – 18 September 2013)

Operational functions
The Administrative Arrangements Order made on 18 September 2013 detailed the following responsibilities to the department:

 Broadband policy and programs
 Postal and telecommunications policies and programs
 Spectrum policy management
 Broadcasting policy
 National policy issues relating to the digital economy
 Content policy relating to the information economy

References

Communications
Australia, Communications
2013 establishments in Australia
2015 disestablishments in Australia